Neo-capitalism is an economic ideology which blends some elements of capitalism with other systems. The new capitalism was new compared to the capitalism in the era before World War II.

Social and economic ideology that arose in the second half of the 20th century and in which the capitalist doctrine becomes deeper, being based on technological revolution and on the internationalization of the markets.

It is a term used to designate a new form of capitalism that is characterized for correcting its excesses by means of the application of measures that guard over the social well-being.

The important aspects include a great economic freedom, attaching the private property of the industries and companies, moderated with a centralized economic planning, which can include that the state is an owner of some means of production.

It tries to support a balance between the economic growth, lower inflation, low levels of unemployment, good conditions of work, social assistance and good public services, across the intervention of the state in the economy.

It arises in the technological companies reconstructed in the postwar period.

One of its more outstanding representatives is the Keynesian economist Paul Samuelson.

See also 
 State monopoly capitalism
 Neoliberalism

References 

Capitalist systems
Cooperatives
Economic ideologies
Economic liberalism
Ideologies
Social philosophy